Newtok Airport  is a state-owned public-use airport located one nautical mile (1.85 km) west of the central business district of Newtok, a village in the Bethel Census Area of the U.S. state of Alaska.

Although most U.S. airports use the same three-letter location identifier for the FAA and IATA, this airport is assigned EWU by the FAA and WWT by the IATA.

Facilities 
Newtok Airport has one runway designated 15/33 with a gravel surface measuring is 2,202 by 35 feet (671 x 11 m).

Airlines and destinations

References

External links 
 FAA Alaska airport diagram (GIF)

Airports in the Bethel Census Area, Alaska